Thaumetopoea is a genus of moths belonging to the family Notodontidae. It was first described by Jacob Hübner in 1820.

In their caterpillar form, they bear the vernacular name of processionary because their gregarious larvae conspicuously move in single file. The adults live a few days without feeding.

Some Thaumetopoea species, for example Thaumetopoea pityocampa, are expanding their range towards higher latitudes and altitudes due to the current climate warming. The caterpillars carry urticating hairs which cause health problems in humans.

Systematics 
"looking remarkable". This explains why the name is sometimes spelled Thaumatopoea, i.e. in the latinized form of  thaumatopoiia "marvellous achievement" (cf.  thauma "marvel, wonder"). 

The genus Thaumetopoea contains the following species:
 Thaumetopoea bonjeani (Powell, 1922) - cedar processionary
 Thaumetopoea herculeana Rambur, 1840
 Thaumetopoea pinivora (Treitschke, 1834) or Traumatocampa pinivora (Treitschke 1834) - eastern pine processionary
 Thaumetopoea pityocampa (Denis and Schiffermüller, 1775) or Traumatocampa pityocampa (Denis & Schiffermüller 1775) - pine processionary
 Thaumetopoea processionea (Linnaeus, 1758) - oak processionary
 Thaumetopoea solitaria (Freyer, 1838) - pistachio processionary or solitary
 Thaumetopoea wilkinsoni Tams, 1924 or Traumatocampa wilkinsoni (Tams 1926)
 Thaumetopoea hellenica
 Thaumetopoea mediterranea

References 

Thaumetopoeinae